Head Taunsa Barrage is a barrage on the River Indus in Taunsa district  of Dera Ghazi Khan District, Punjab province of Pakistan. It is  
This barrage controls water flow in the River Indus for irrigation and flood control purposes. Taunsa Barrage was designated a Ramsar site on 22 March 1996.

This barrage serves 2.351 million acres (951,400 hectares) of land besides diverting flows from Indus River to the Chenab River through Taunsa-Panjnad Link Canal (TP Link Canal). The barrage also serves as an arterial road bridge, a railway bridge, and crossing for gas and oil pipelines, telephone line and extra high voltage (EHV) transmission lines.

Background
Taunsa Barrage was completed in 1958. Head Draftsman Syed Tufail Hussain Shah received Silver Medal from President of Pakistan Field Marshal Mohammad Ayub Khan on their commendable services rendered on the completion of Taunsa Barrage on March 3, 1959. The canal system fed by the barrage initially consisted of Muzaffargarh and Dera Ghazi Khan Khan canals. The former was completed in 1960 and is in operation since then, while the latter although opened in 1958 continued to remain under construction in some later years. TP Link canal was added in 1970, as a component work o.
]].

Taunsa Barrage has been identified as the barrage with the highest priority for rehabilitation. It requires urgent measures to avoid severe economic and social impacts on the lives of millions of poor farmers through interruption of irrigation on two million acres (8,000 km2) and drinking water in the rural areas of southern Punjab, benefiting several million farmers. Taunsa Barrage is one of the most vulnerable water diversion projects built on Indus River.

In April 2004, the World Bank approved a $123 million loan to Pakistan to rehabilitate the Taunsa Barrage on the River Indus whose structure had been damaged owing to soil erosion and old-age. The project was designed to ensure irrigation of the cultivated lands in the area of the Muzaffargarh and Dera Ghazi Khan Tehsil canals, and through the TP Link Canal that supplements the water supply to Panjnad headworks canals.

In 2011, the rehabilitation of the Taunsa Barrage was blamed for devastation of the Muzaffargarh district during the 2010 Pakistan floods. Critics blamed the rehabilitation of the barrage, alleging that it failed to raise its height and strengthen protective embankments, used dysfunctional computer control system of the hoist gates and ignored hill-torrent management.

See also
 List of barrages and headworks in Pakistan
 List of dams and reservoirs in Pakistan

References 

Irrigation in Pakistan
Locks (water navigation)
Dams in Pakistan
Ramsar sites in Pakistan
Dams completed in 1958
Dams on the Indus River